Curzon Street railway station may refer to:

Birmingham Curzon Street railway station (1838-1966), closed railway station in England
Birmingham Curzon Street railway station, proposed High Speed 2 railway station in England